The Roorkee Municipal Corporation is the civic body that governs the city of Roorkee in Uttarakhand, India.

Structure 
This corporation consists of 40 wards  and is headed by a mayor who presides over a deputy mayor and 39 other corporators representing the wards. The mayor is elected directly through a first-past-the-post voting system and the deputy mayor is elected by the corporators from among their numbers.

List of mayors of the Roorkee Municipal Corporation

References

Roorkee
Municipal corporations in Uttarakhand
Year of establishment missing